Bellafonte is a surname. Notable people with the surname include:

Amy Bellafonte, fictional character
Harry Belafonte (born 1927), American singer, songwriter, activist, and actor
Shari Belafonte (born 1954), actress, model, writer, singer, daughter of Harry Belafinte
 Belafonte (album), musical album by Harry Belafonte